Miryalaguda railway station (station code: MRGA) is a major railway station in the Nalgonda district of the southern state of Telangana, India.

History 
Miryalaguda Railway station was opened in 1989, after the completion of Nadikudi-Pagidipalli section.

Passenger amenities 
It is one of the stations in the division to be equipped with Automatic Ticket Vending Machines (ATVM's).

New lines 
A new railway line is being constructed from Vishnupuram to Janpahad–Mellacheruvu–Motumarri, where it will join the Kazipet–Vijayawada mail line.

Freight 
It serves the FCI godown and Paradigm Logistics.

References 

Railway stations in Nalgonda district